Joe Burchell (April 1873 – October 1932) was an English football manager who led Walsall from 1921 to 1926. A former player at Walsall Unity, he became Walsall F.C. club secretary during World War I, and was appointed as manager in August 1921. He resigned in February 1926, following a run of bad results, and was replaced by David Ashworth. Burchell stayed on in his post as secretary until 1931, when he became a publican. He was briefly a director at Hednesford Town, before he died following a short illness in October 1932.

References

1873 births
1932 deaths
Sportspeople from Walsall
English football managers
Walsall F.C. managers
English Football League managers
British publicans